Robert Scott Wilson (born 25 September 1898) was a Scottish footballer who played mainly as a centre half.

Career
Born and raised in Bellshill, he began his senior career with Third Lanark, making 30 Scottish Football League appearances in the 1922–23 Scottish Division One season. In the summer of 1923 he took part in the club's tour of South America and three months later featured on the losing side in the final of the Glasgow Cup; however, he made only four league appearances that season and moved on to Bradford (Park Avenue) in England, where he underwent a positional change and became a centre forward, succeeding in the role to the extent that he finished the club's leading scorer for the campaign with 25 goals in the Football League Third Division North.

In late 1925 Wilson moved to the United States and the American Soccer League, reverting to a more defensive position and initially featuring not for the Fall River Marksmen as had been rumoured, but for newcomers the Shawsheen Indians before switching to the Marksmen in time to play a part in their 1925–26 American Soccer League title-winning campaign. He remained with Fall River for two further seasons, winning the 1927 National Challenge Cup with a 7–0 win over Holley Carburetor  lining up alongside several other Scots including another former Third Lanark player Charlie McGill. After a single trial appearance in the ASL for Bethlehem Steel, Wilson transferred to the Pawtucket Rangers (also known as J. & P. Coats) for the 1928–29 season which was his last in the league. It is believed that he remained in the United States after his playing career, settling in California.

References

1898 births
Year of death missing
Scottish footballers
Footballers from Bellshill
Association football central defenders
Association football forwards
Highland Football League players
Bradford (Park Avenue) A.F.C. players
Cambuslang Rangers F.C. players
Third Lanark A.C. players
Pawtucket Rangers players
Bethlehem Steel F.C. (1907–1930) players
Shawsheen Indians players
Fall River Marksmen players
English Football League players
Scottish Junior Football Association players
Scottish Football League players
American Soccer League (1921–1933) players
Scottish expatriate sportspeople in the United States
Expatriate soccer players in the United States
Scottish expatriate footballers
Scottish emigrants to the United States